The 2011 Challenger of Dallas was a professional tennis tournament played on indoor hard courts. It was a Challenger of Dallas competition that forms part of the 2011 ATP Challenger Tour. It took place in Dallas, United States, between 28 February and 6 March 2011.

The defending champions in the singles tournament was Ryan Sweeting from the US, while the doubles champions, also from the US, were Scott Lipsky and David Martin.

ATP entrants

Seeds

 Rankings are as of February 21, 2011.

Other entrants
The following players received wildcards into the singles main draw:
  Denis Kudla
  Jack Sock
  Bernard Tomic
  Michael Yani

The following players received entry from the qualifying draw:
  Alexander Domijan
  Andrei Dăescu
  Jarmere Jenkins
  Phillip Simmonds

Champions

Singles

 Alex Bogomolov Jr. def.  Rainer Schüttler, 7–6(7–5), 6–3

Doubles

 Scott Lipsky /  Rajeev Ram def.  Dustin Brown /  Björn Phau, 7–6(7–3), 6–4

References

Official website
ITF Search
ATP World Tour: Official website

External links

Challenger of Dallas
Challenger of Dallas
Challenger of Dallas
Challenger of Dallas
Challenger of Dallas
Challenger of Dallas